Cyril Odutemu is an Anglican archbishop in Nigeria.

Odutemu is Bishop of Ughelli and Archbishop of Bendel.

Notes

Living people
Anglican bishops of Ughelli
Anglican archbishops of Bendel
21st-century Anglican archbishops
21st-century Anglican bishops in Nigeria
Year of birth missing (living people)